H. Dean Proctor (born  1942) is an American politician who currently serves as a member of the North Carolina Senate. A Republican from Hickory, North Carolina, he represents the 45th district (which includes all of Catawba County, as well as part of Caldwell County).

Early life and education
Proctor was born around 1942. Proctor earned a bachelor's in business administration from the University of North Carolina at Chapel Hill.

Career
Proctor is a retired beverage wholesaler, who served as the executive of United Beverages. He has previously served on the North Carolina Department of Transportation board and the North Carolina Wildlife Resources Commission board. In July 2020, State Senator Andy Wells resigned from the state senate to serve on the state wildlife resources commission. On August 15, 2020, Proctor was appointed by Catawba and Alexander County Republican leaders to serve the rest of Wells' term in the state senate seat representing the 42nd district. On March 3, 2020, Proctor won the primary against former state representative Mark Hollo to keep his seat in the state senate. On November 3, 2020, Proctor won the general election for the position.

Personal life
Proctor lives in Hickory, North Carolina.

Electoral history

2022

2020

References

|-

Living people
1940s births
Businesspeople from North Carolina
Republican Party North Carolina state senators
People from Hickory, North Carolina
University of North Carolina at Chapel Hill alumni
21st-century American politicians